Soren Baker is an American journalist who has spent his career covering hip-hop. Best known for his six years as one of the main editors of The Source, Baker has had more than 3,500 articles published in such publications as The New York Times, Los Angeles Times, Chicago Tribune, XXL, The Source, HipHopDX and RedBullUSA.com.

The Maryland native has penned liner notes for albums by 2Pac, Ice Cube, N.W.A, Gang Starr and others. He has also worked on television programs for VH1 and Fuse. Baker has also written extensively about sports, specifically the NFL and published books about the Baltimore Ravens. Baker has written, produced and directed multiple DVDs including Tech N9ne: The Psychumentary. From 2014 to 2016 he also co-hosted Open Bar Radio with Xzibit on KDAY in Los Angeles.

Baker has been interviewed multiple times, including by Rolling Stone, ESPN, and TV One, among others. From 2013 to 2016 he served as the news editor of HipHopDX. In March 2016 he founded Unique Access Entertainment which delivers original, exclusive video content with A-List entertainers, including MC Ren, Nice & Smooth, G Perico, T. Rodgers, MC Eiht, Skeme, Dana Dane, CJ Mac, Big Tray Deee, RBX, Mitchy Slick, and Slink Johnson. The network has aired more than 270 videos.

Soren Baker's book The History Of Gangster Rap: From Schoolly D to Kendrick Lamar, the Rise of a Great American Art form was published October 2, 2018, by Abrams Books.

Author
Baker has authored or co-authored more than 10 books.

References

American male journalists
American music journalists
American music critics
Hip hop people